Lubcha (Lubtsh) is a town near Neman River, in Belarus, Grodno Region, Novogrudok District, 23 km from Novogrudok.

History
Within the Grand Duchy of Lithuania, Lubcha was part of Nowogródek Voivodeship. 

In 1795, the town was acquired by the Russian Empire as a result of the Third Partition of Poland. From 1921 until 1939, Lubcha (Lubcz) was part of the Second Polish Republic. Before World War II, approximately 1500 Jews lived in Lubcha. There were 2 synagogues and a Jewish cemetery.

In September 1939, Lubcha was occupied by the Red Army and, on 14 November 1939, incorporated into the Byelorussian SSR.
From 26 June 1941 until 8 July 1944, Lubcha was occupied by Nazi Germany and administered as a part of the Generalbezirk Weißruthenien of Reichskommissariat Ostland. 

A short time after their arrival, the Germans selected 50 Jewish men and brought them to Novogrudok, where they were shot. In March 1942, a ghetto was fenced in and Jews from surroundings villages, like Delatyche, were brought into the ghetto. Later, three members of the Judenrat and Jewish police were shot by the Germans under the pretext of bad hygienic conditions inside the ghetto. Although the fate of the remaining Jews is not completely clear, it seems that a group was sent to the Novogrudok ghetto, where they were later shot in August 1942. Another group was sent to complete road construction near the village of Vorobyeviche, where they were also shot in August 1942. It appears that several hundred Jews were shot and buried in the cemetery during spring 1942.

Sights
 Lubcz Castle of the Radziwill family
 Orthodox church of Saint Elijah (1910–14)
 Catholic church, 1930
 Old Jewish cemetery

References

External links 
 Lubcha's Castle (in Belarusian)
 Photos on Radzima.org
 Views of the castle and town
 Lubcha's history (in Russian)

Holocaust locations in Belarus
Holocaust locations in Poland
Navahrudak District
Novogrudsky Uyezd
Nowogródek Voivodeship (1919–1939)
Populated places in Grodno Region
Urban-type settlements in Belarus